"Satisfy" is a song by British electronic music trio Nero. It was released on 14 May 2014 as the lead single from Nero's second studio album, Between II Worlds. It peaked at number 50 on the UK Singles Chart.

Background and release
Nero began the campaign for their second studio album in November 2013, announcing it by posting an ambient piece looped for a duration of 28:08 on their SoundCloud.

On 13 May 2014, the song premiered on BBC Radio 1 as Zane Lowe's Hottest Record in the World. It was released to digital retailers the following day.

Remixes and cover versions
Unofficial remixes of the song by a number of high-profile artists in the drum and bass scene have emerged since the song's release. TC and Koncept, as well as RAM Records artists LoKo and Audio have all created bootlegs of the song. These have received airplay on BBC Radio 1, 1Xtra and Rinse FM.

Charts

References

2014 songs
2014 singles
MTA Records singles